The Edwin Johnson Three-Decker is a historic three-decker in Worcester, Massachusetts. When the building was listed on the National Register of Historic Places in 1990,  it was highlighted for its Queen Anne styling, including a three-tier porch with turned balusters, bracketed roofs, and spindled friezes.  Since then, much of this detail has been removed or obscured (see photo). It was built about 1892, during a triple-decker construction boom in the Crown Hill area west of the city downtown.

See also
National Register of Historic Places listings in northwestern Worcester, Massachusetts
National Register of Historic Places listings in Worcester County, Massachusetts

References

Apartment buildings in Worcester, Massachusetts
Apartment buildings on the National Register of Historic Places in Massachusetts
Queen Anne architecture in Massachusetts
Houses completed in 1892
National Register of Historic Places in Worcester, Massachusetts